John Bigge (1780–1843) was an English judge and royal commissioner

John Bigge may also refer to:

John Bigge (MP) ( 1411–1421), MP for Lincoln

See also
John Bigg (disambiguation)
John Biggs (disambiguation)